Daniel Francis (born 27 September 2003) is a Nigerian professional footballer who plays as a midfielder for Austrian Bundesliga club Austria Klagenfurt, on loan from Bayern Munich II.

Club career
Having played football in his native Nigeria with Hearts of Abuja, Francis took the opportunity to train at Bayern Munich's facilities in July and August 2021, after he was selected as one of the FC Bayern World Squad members. He had already had contact with the German side after playing at the Bayern Youth Cup in 2019, however, due to the COVID-19 pandemic in Nigeria, he was unable to sign at the time.

Following an impressive showing with the World Squad, in which he was named captain, he signed a three-year contract in August 2022. In signing for Bayern Munich, he became the Bavarian club's first ever Nigerian player. Immediately after signing for Bayern Munich II, the club's reserve team, he was loaned to affiliate club Austria Klagenfurt of the Austrian Bundesliga as well as the reserve team on the Kärntner Liga.

International career
Francis has represented Nigeria at under-17 level.

Career statistics

Club

Notes

References

2003 births
Living people
Nigerian footballers
Nigeria youth international footballers
Association football midfielders
FC Bayern Munich footballers
SK Austria Klagenfurt players
Nigerian expatriate footballers
Nigerian expatriate sportspeople in Germany
Expatriate footballers in Germany
Nigerian expatriate sportspeople in Austria
Expatriate footballers in Austria